West Lebanon is an unincorporated community in Wayne County, in the U.S. state of Ohio.

History
The first settlement at West Lebanon was made in 1808.  West Lebanon was platted in 1833, and named after West Lebanon, Lebanon County, Pennsylvania, the native home of a first settler. A post office called West Lebanon was established in 1846, and remained in operation until 1907.

References

Unincorporated communities in Wayne County, Ohio
Unincorporated communities in Ohio